John David Baker (born September 30, 1990) is an American football coach who is the co-offensive coordinator and tight ends coach for the Ole Miss Rebels football team. Baker played for the Amarillo Venom of the Lone Star Football League (LSFL) and Champions Indoor Football (CIF) from 2014 to 2015.

Prior to joining the Ole Miss football staff he was the offensive quality control assistant for both North Texas and USC before becoming the tight ends coach for the Trojans in 2020.

Early life and playing career
Baker grew up in San Angelo, Texas and attended Lake View High School, where he was a member of the  basketball, baseball, football, and track and field teams. He was named the All-West Texas MVP by the San Angelo Standard-Times as a senior after passing for 2,240 yards and 22 touchdowns while also rushing for 688 yards and 18 touchdowns. 

Baker played college football at the Abilene Christian University. He redshirted his true freshman season and was a backup quarterback for his next three seasons for the Wildcats. Baker was named the starting quarterback going into his redshirt senior season. In his only season as a starter, he completed 247-of-369 passes for 3,376 yards with 35 touchdowns and five interceptions and also rushed for 256 yards and five touchdowns.

After his collegiate career, Baker played professional indoor football for the Amarillo Venom of the Lone Star Football League (LSFL) and Champions Indoor Football (CIF) from 2014 to 2015.

Coaching career

Early years 
Baker began his coaching career as a graduate assistant at Abilene Christian in 2014. He was hired as an offensive quality control assistant at North Texas (UNT) in 2016. Baker spent three seasons at North Texas before joining the coaching staff at USC in the same role after the program hired former UNT offensive coordinator Graham Harrell. Baker was promoted to tight ends coach after one season at USC.

Ole Miss 
Baker was hired as the tight ends coach and passing game coordinator at Ole Miss on January 28, 2021. He was promoted to co-Offensive Coordinator in addition to tight ends coach entering the 2022 season.

References

External links
 Abilene Christian Wildcats player bio
 Ole Miss Rebels coaching bio

Living people
American football quarterbacks
Abilene Christian Wildcats football players
Amarillo Venom players
Abilene Christian Wildcats football coaches
North Texas Mean Green football coaches
USC Trojans football coaches
Ole Miss Rebels football coaches
People from San Angelo, Texas
1990 births